This is a list of political entities in the 11th century (1001–1100) AD. It includes both sovereign states and any political predecessors of current sovereign states.

Political entities

See also
List of Bronze Age states
List of Iron Age states
List of Classical Age states
List of states during Late Antiquity
List of states during the Middle Ages
List of political entities in the 10th century

References

+11
11th century
11th century-related lists